BJR can refer to:
 Born Just Right, American Record & Film Producer
 Brad Jones Racing, an Australian V8 Supercar motor racing team
 British Journal of Radiology, an official peer reviewed journal of The British Institute of Radiology
 Business judgment rule, a Corporate law concept
 Beijing Renmin Guangbo Diantai, a chain of Chinese radio stations